Burapha University (BUU) (Thai: มหาวิทยาลัยบูรพา) is one of Thailand's public universities. It is in the coastal town of Saen Suk, near the beach of Bangsaen in Chonburi province. It was established on 8 July 1955, originating from Bangsaen Educational College which was the first regional tertiary educational institute. The university offers degrees in more than 50 programs of study, including 75 master's programs, three EdD programs, and 22 PhD programs.

Burapha University has three campuses: 
Burapha University, Chonburi Campus, Mueang Chonburi district, Chonburi province established in 1955.
Burapha University, Chanthaburi Campus, Tha Mai district, Chanthaburi province established in 1996.
Burapha University, Sakaeo Campus, Watthana Nakhon district, Sa Kaeo province established in 1997.

The university colors are gray and gold. Gray represents the progress of intellectual knowledge. Gold represents morality. The colors represent University's commitment to the intellectual knowledge and morality.

In September 2016, Prime Minister Prayut Chan-o-cha invoked Section 44 of the interim charter allowing him to form a special panel to take over administration of the university as it was judged to be incapable of administering itself.

History

The university began as Bangsaen Educational College established on 8 July 1955, the first tertiary educational institution outside of Bangkok established to encourage teacher education. There were 41 first generation students.

In 1956 the college received Piboonbumpen School from the Division of General Education to be a demonstration school of the college and renamed it "Piboonbumpen" Demonstration School.

In 1984, when the Prasarnmitr College of Education in Bangkok was upgraded to university level and named Srinakharinwirot University, Bangsaen Educational College was included as a branch campus and started to offer degrees besides teacher education. In 1988, the cabinet was agreed to transform its status to become a new university and In 1990, as a result of the implementation the Thai government's Eastern Seaboard Development Project to industrialize the area, the Bangsaen Campus was upgraded to full university level and renamed Burapha University, which means "University of the East".

For more effective pedagogical management; for instance, Chanthaburi Campus was established in 1996 and one year later Sakaeo Campus was established.

Aside from its status as a government university, many students are drawn to the institution due to its location in Bangsaen, a resort destination popular with Thai tourists (particularly day visitors from Bangkok) that remains relatively unknown to foreign visitors.

In addition, the university contains service centers such as the Institute of Marine Science, whose aquarium is a major tourist attraction, the Library Center, the Academic Services Center, the Computer Center, and the University Hospital, which provides extensive medical services to the surrounding community.

Faculty, College and School

Burapha University has three campuses, which together cover about 1,353.35 acres (5.48 km2) of land. Burapha University consists of Twenty-Two faculties, One college and One School.

Burapha University, Chonburi Campus
 Faculty of Abhibhubejr Thai Traditional Medicine
 Faculty of Allied Health Sciences
 Faculty of Education
 Faculty of Engineering
 Faculty of Fine and Applied Arts 
 Faculty of Geo-Informatics
 Faculty of Humanities and Social Sciences
 Faculty of Informatics
 Faculty of Logistics
 Faculty of Management and Tourism
 Faculty of Medicine (link)
 Faculty of Nursing
 Faculty of Political Science and Law
 Faculty of Pharmaceutical Sciences 
 Faculty of Public Health
 Faculty of Science
 Faculty of Sport Science
 Burapha University International College
 Graduate School of Public Administration
 Graduate School of Commerce
 College of Research Methodology and Cognitive Science

Burapha University, Chanthaburi campus
 Faculty of Marine Technology
 Faculty of Gems
 Faculty of Science and Art

Burapha University, Sakaeo Campus
 Faculty of Agricultural Technology
 Faculty of Science and Social Sciences

Research Institutes/Schools
 Burapha University Hospital
 Institute of Marine Science
 Institute for Research in Culture and the Arts
 Institute for Burapha Linux
 Language Institute
 Korean Studies Center
 Eastern Region Center Space Technology and Geo-Informatics
 Vocational Education Demonstration School
 Piboonbumpen Demonstration School (K-12)

Rankings

Webometrics 
Burapha University overall ranks in the nation is 11th ranked by Webometrics.  The international ranks are between 191-200 in Asia (Quacquarelli Symonds, 2013)

World's Universities with Real Impact (WURI) 
World's Universities with Real Impact (WURI) ranks Burapha University in the 80th in the world by the ranking of 100 Innovative Universities 2020 (WURI 2020: Global Top 100 Innovative Universities) as the only university in Thailand to be ranked. This time The ranking results were announced in an online conference on June 11, 2020. Burapha University is also ranked 23rd on the TOP 50 Industrial Application and 40th on the TOP 50 Entrepreneurial Spirit.

Gallery

External links
 
 BUU library

Notes 

Universities in Thailand
Educational institutions established in 1955
Chonburi province
1955 establishments in Thailand